GreenChip is a technology brand of Philips Semiconductors (now NXP Semiconductors) and is used in the company's range of power adapter ICs with the same name. GreenChip ICs were used in power adapters and power supplies, as well as energy-saving CFL bulbs and LED lighting products. In 2011, NXP introduced the GreenChip smart lighting solution—including the GreenChip iCFL for compact fluorescent lamps and the GreenChip iSSL for LEDs—to enable quick start times, dimming, extended lifetimes, and wireless connectivity via IPv4 or IPv6 using JenNet-IP network layer software.

History
The TEA1504 was the first IC to bear the GreenChip name. Released in 1998, it was a SMPS controller with integrated standby burst mode aimed at CRT monitor applications. Improvements to standby behavior meant the chip realized a < 3 W consumption (the Energy Star target at the time), without needing a separate standby power supply.

The second generation GreenChip II products appeared in 2000 with the release of the TEA1507, a quasi-resonant flyback SMPS controller targeted at standby power savings in monitors, TVs, and VCRs It could achieve a standby performance of < 1 W and boasted efficiency improvements well beyond 90%. The IC was built in close cooperation with Philips CE TV and was included in the designs of numerous TV manufacturers.

In 2002/2003, the GreenChip II TEA155x series was released. Derived from the TEA1507, the new series was specifically aimed at notebook adapters.The GreenChip II series was capable of reducing notebook adapter no-load power to below 500 mW (a 100% improvement over the state-of-the-art 1 W at that time). It also improved system robustness by integrating more adapter-specific protections and signalling conditioning functionality. The TEA155x grew to take a dominant share of the notebook adapter market.

The third generation GreenChip III arrived in 2007 with the launch of the TEA1750.The GreenChip III is used in the power adapters of notebook PCs, power supplies for small PCs and all-in-one integrated systems like the iMac.

The GreenChip SR, a secondary control IC for notebook adapters, was launched in 2006 with the TEA176x family. The GreenChip SR family was extended in 2009 with the TEA179x family. The GreenChip SR is a control circuit for the output stage of power supplies. By replacing diode rectifiers with active MOSFET rectification, GreenChip SR enabled typical loss reductions of 20-30%.

In 2006, Philips also introduced the GreenChip PC, a chipset featuring a new topology designed to increase the overall efficiency of desktop PC power supplies by more than 80 percent; at the time, most desktop PC power supplies were only 60 to 70 percent efficient when operating. The GreenChip PC was based on patented Philips technology, integrating the standby supply into the main converter, reducing the number of external components required.

Addressing 10-70 W class power supplies, the TEA173x GreenChip Low Power generation was launched the end of 2009. The TEA173x targeted high volume computing (netbook, printer, monitor) and consumer (STB, DVD, Blu-ray, audio) applications.

GreenChip Resonant ICs such as the TEA1713, launched in early 2010, extend the higher end of the Greenchip portfolio. They feature a resonant converter capable of being applied from 90 to 600 W. They are suitable for applications including LCD TV and high density travel adapters.

2010 also saw the advent of GreenChip ICs for lamps. These enable the creation of compact energy-saving CFL bulbs that resemble the familiar incandescent bulbs.

Technology
The first and second generation of GreenChip ICs used a combination of High Voltage DMOS and more dense BiCMOS for control in multi-chip configurations. In the second generation and after, BiCMOS was replaced by the A-BCD2 (Advanced Bipolar CMOS DMOS 2) process.

References

NXP Semiconductors